Mohammadabad (also Romanized as Moḩammadābād and Muhammadābād) is a village in Meyami Rural District, Meyami District, Shahrud County, Semnan Province, Iran. At the 2006 census, its population was 976, in 274 families.

References 

Populated places in Shahrud County